Isabella Haleʻala Kaʻili Desha (née Miller Jan. 16, 1864 - Feb. 28, 1949) was a highly regarded Hawaiian composer, musician and kumu hula during the Kingdom of Hawaii and throughout her life. She is descended from notable chiefly lines.

Birth and early life
She was one of five children. Her father was Alika (Alexander) Mela (Miller). She, along with her mother, Kapuailohiawahine Kanuha Miller, herself a notable kumu hula, composer and dancer of her time, would teach the dance in a secret Hawaiian hālau. Isabella's sibling's included John Mahiʻai Miller/Kāneakua.

Isabella married George Langhern Desha, the Postmaster for Hilo, Hawaii, and had four children, including William Francis Desha and Helen Desha Beamer. Writing in his book, "Learn to Play Hawaiian Slack Key Guitar", Keola Beamer states that Helen Beamer and her mother Isabella would dance the hula, Kūwili as a spontaneous celebration during family gatherings.

She is the matriarch of the Beamer musical dynasty, considered the most notable musical family in the history of the Hawaiian islands. The family includes award winning musicians, composers, historians and activists that have perpetuated Hawaiian culture and history for over 100 years. She was forced to teach the hula in secret due to the puritanical beliefs of the Calvinist missionaries.

Beamer method of hula
During the reign of King David Kalakaua, the formerly banned native dance known as hula was given a mandate from the monarch to be brought back to both the Royal Court and in public display. Many of the hula master of the time came forward from different parts of the islands representing different parts of the old alii kingdoms. Through this restoration of the dance, was preserved the identification of the original four alii kingdoms through chant.

Family tree

References

1860 births
1936 deaths
Hawaiian nobility
Royalty of the Hawaiian Kingdom
Nobility of the Americas